Mary Jane Rathbun (June 11, 1860 – April 4, 1943) was an American zoologist who specialized in crustaceans. She worked at the Smithsonian Institution from 1884 until her death. She described more than a thousand new species and subspecies and many higher taxa.

Biography
Mary Jane Rathbun was born on June 11, 1860, in Buffalo, New York, the youngest of five children of Charles Rathbun and Jane Furey. Her mother died when she was only one year old, and Mary was therefore "thrown on her own resources". She was schooled in Buffalo, graduating in 1878, but never attended college.

Rathbun first saw the ocean in 1881 when she accompanied her brother, Richard Rathbun, to Woods Hole, Massachusetts. He was employed as a scientific assistant to Addison Emery Verrill, alongside Verrill's chief assistant, the carcinologist Sidney Irving Smith. Rathbun helped label, sort and record Smith's specimens, and worked on crustaceans ever since. 
For three years, Rathbun worked on a voluntary basis for her brother, before being granted a clerkship by Spencer Fullerton Baird at the Smithsonian Institution.

She continued to work at the museum, and after 28 years, she was promoted to assistant curator in charge of the Division of Crustacea. In 1915, after her retirement, the Smithsonian Institution designated Rathbun an "Honorary Research Associate", and in 1916 she was granted an honorary master's degree by the University of Pittsburgh. She qualified for a Ph.D. at George Washington University in 1917. Rathbun was a member of the American Association for the Advancement of Science, the Washington Academy of Sciences, and the Wild Flower Preservation Society.

She died in Washington, D.C., on April 4, 1943, at the age of 82, from complications associated with a broken hip.

Publications

Rathbun's first publication was co-written with James Everard Benedict and concerned the genus Panopeus; it was published in 1891. She retired on the last day of 1914, but did not stop working until her death.
She wrote or cowrote 166 papers in total, including descriptions of 1147 new species and subspecies, 63 new genera, one subfamily, 3 families and a superfamily, as well as other nomenclatural novelties. The taxa first described by Rathbun include important commercial species such as the Atlantic blue crab Callinectes sapidus, and the tanner crab, Chionoecetes bairdi.

Taxa
A number of taxa have been named in honor of Mary J. Rathbun:

Hamatoscalpellum rathbunae (Pilsbry, 1907)
Maera rathbunae Pearse, 1908
Paromola rathbuni Porter Mosso, 1908
Synalphaeus rathbunae Coutiere, 1909
Candidiopotamon rathbunae De Man, 1914
Pasiphaea rathbunae (Stebbing, 1914)
Petrolisthes rathbunae Schmitt, 1916
Periclimenes rathbunae Schmitt, 1924
Alpheus rathbunae (Schmitt, 1924)
Campylonotus rathbunae Schmitt, 1926
Callinectes rathbunae Contreras, 1930
Eriosachila rathbunae Maury, 1930
Tritodynamia rathbunae Shen, 1932
Sacculina rathbunae Boschma, 1933
Pinnixa rathbunae Sakai, 1934
Emerita rathbunae Schmitt, 1935
Callianassa rathbunae Schmitt, 1935
Solenocera rathbunae Ramadan, 1938
Thunor rathbunae Armstrong, 1949
Lysmata rathbunae Chace, 1970
Xanthias rathbunae Takeda, 1976
Cyphocarcinus rathbunae Griffin & Tranter, 1986
Asterias rathbunae Britajev, 1989
Lophaxius rathbunae Kensley, 1989
Rhynchocinetes rathbunae Okuno, 1996
Palaeopinnixa rathbunae Schweitzer & Feldmann, 2000
Marratha Ng & Clark, 2003

See also
Timeline of women in science

References

External links

Mary Jane Rathbun Papers, 1886-1938 and undated from the Smithsonian Institution Archives

Bionomia profile, showing specimens collected and/or identified by Rathbone, and the science enabled

1860 births
1943 deaths
American carcinologists
Women zoologists
Smithsonian Institution people
George Washington University alumni
Scientists from Buffalo, New York
19th-century American zoologists
20th-century American zoologists
19th-century American women scientists
20th-century American women scientists
19th-century American women writers
20th-century American women writers
19th-century American non-fiction writers
20th-century American non-fiction writers